The Bright Stalk Wind Farm is a 57-turbine wind farm near Chenoa in northeastern McLean County in the U.S. state of Illinois. The turbines were designed to generate a maximum of 205 megawatts of electricity.  The complex was completed in 2019 by EDP Renewables North America at a cost of more than $300 million, and entered operations in 2020.

Detail
The Bright Stalk project's 57 wind turbines are each rated at 3.6 mW.  203 megawatts of the project's overall 205-mW capacity were pre-sold to Walmart (123 mW) and Salesforce (80 mW).  The project owner states that the wind farm has created nine permanent jobs in and around Chenoa.

References

Energy infrastructure completed in 2019
Wind farms in Illinois
Buildings and structures in McLean County, Illinois